Alba Florio (21 April 1910 in Scilla – 31 May 2011 in Messina) was an Italian poetess, the last belonging to the Decadentism current.

Life 
She was born in Scilla and grew up in Calabria, soaking up its traditions and its ways of thinking and putting everything in verses since her teenage years.

Her introverted nature and the fact that she lived in a tiny village in Calabria kept her away from all the cultural and editorial circle, which led to poor diffusion of her work. When Estasi e preghiere (1929), her first poetry collection, came out, very few people noticed the young poetess. The old poet Vincenzo Gerace, that shared with her the Calabrian origin, was one of the few who did notice wrote an ode about her.

Oltremorte (1936) was the last of Alba's hermetic works. In her writing, she was heavily influenced by Giovanni Pascoli, echoed the dramatic tones of Giuseppe Ungaretti and opened herself to Salvatore Quasimodo's new propositions: in those years, Quasimodo was living in Messina and Reggio Calabria. With Oltremorte Alba won the "Maria Enrica Viola" poetry prize.

In her two last collections, Troveremo il pane sconosciuto (1939) and Come mare a riva (1956), existential pessimism is deeply present and largely explored. «Vegliamo la tempesta / crocifissi alle rocce / albatri dagli occhi viola» («We watch over the storm / crucified to the rocks / Purple-eyed albatri»). The same themes represent in many of Lorenzo Calogero lyrics, born in the same years and place of Alba.

When Alba died she was 100 years old.

Collections 

 Estasi e preghiere, Messina, 1929.
 Oltremorte, Milano, I.T.E., 1936.
 Troveremo il paese sconosciuto, Modena, Guanda, 1939.
 Come mare a riva, Messina, 1956.
 Ultima striscia di cielo, Cosenza, Pellegrini, 2000 (introduction by Antonio Piromalli).

References 

1910 births
2011 deaths
People from Scilla, Calabria
20th-century Italian poets
Women centenarians
Italian centenarians